Gerry Mulligan Meets Johnny Hodges is an album recorded by American jazz saxophonists Gerry Mulligan and Johnny Hodges featuring performances recorded in 1959 released on the Verve label.

Reception

The Allmusic site awarded the album 4 stars stating "Gerry Mulligan's 1959 studio date with Johnny Hodges is one of the most satisfying sessions of his various meetings with different saxophonists for Verve... Throughout the date, the two saxophonists blend beautifully and complement one another's efforts, even though this was their only opportunity to record together in the studio".

Track listing
All compositions by Johnny Hodges except as indicated
 "Bunny" (Gerry Mulligan) - 5:40
 "What's the Rush" (Mulligan*, Judy Holliday) - 3:40
 "Back Beat" - 7:27
 "What It's All About" - 3:59
 "18 Carrots for Rabbit" (Mulligan) - 5:14
 "Shady Side" - 7:04

Personnel
Gerry Mulligan - baritone saxophone - except track 2
Johnny Hodges - alto saxophone
Claude Williamson - piano
Buddy Clark - bass
Mel Lewis - drums

References

Johnny Hodges albums
Gerry Mulligan albums
1960 albums
Albums produced by Creed Taylor
Verve Records albums